Opuntioideae is a subfamily of the cactus family, Cactaceae. It contains 15 genera divided into five tribes.  The subfamily encompasses roughly 220–250 species, and is geographically distributed throughout the New World from Canada, to Argentina. Members of this subfamily have diverse habits, including small geophytes, hemispherical cushions, shrubs, trees, and columnar cacti consisting of indeterminate branches or determinate terete or spherical segments.

Description
Synapomorphies of Opuntioideae include small deciduous, barbed spines called glochids born on areoles and a bony aril surrounding a campylotropous ovule (inverted and curved, such that the micropyle almost meets the funiculus). Other prominent morphological characters for this subfamily are presence of cylindrical, caducous leaves that tend to be shed by maturity and the sectioning of the stem into joints or pads known as cladodes.

Opuntioideae are unique among cacti for lacking in the stem a thick cortex, an extensive system of cortical bundles, collapsible cortical cells, and medullary bundles. Typically, the epidermis consists of a single layer of irregularly shaped cells, a cuticle at least 1-2 microns thick, and long, uniseriate trichomes in the areoles. Opuntioideae have a hypodermis of at least one layer, very thick walls, and druses (aggregations of calcium oxalate crystals), and their cortical cells have enlarged nuclei; the reason for this is unknown. They also possess mucilage cells.

Notably, their lack of collapsible cortical cells, ribs, and tubercles mean that they cannot absorb water or transfer it intercellularly as easily as the other cacti, so this may place evolutionary constraints on the aridity of habitats and maximum adult size. One adaptation around this problem is the evolution of flattened cladodes that allow opuntioids to swell up with water, increasing in volume without an increase in surface area risking water loss. Opuntioids also lack fiber caps to their phloem bundles, which in other cacti protect against sucking insects and stiffen developing internodes.

Tribes and genera
Tribes and genera of the subfamily Opuntioideae include:

Austrocylindropuntieae

Austrocylindropuntia Backeb.
Cumulopuntia F.Ritter
Punotia  D.R.Hunt
Cylindropuntieae – round stems

Cylindropuntia (Engelm.) F.M.Knuth
Grusonia Rchb.f. ex Britton & Rose
Pereskiopsis Britton & Rose
Quiabentia Britton & Rose

Opuntieae – flattened stems
Brasiliopuntia (K. Schum.) A. Berger
Consolea Lem.
Miqueliopuntia Fric ex F. Ritter
Opuntia Mill.
Salmonopuntia P.V.Heath
Tacinga Britton & Rose
Airampoa Frič

Pterocacteae
Pterocactus K.Schum.

Tephrocacteae – round stems
Maihueniopsis Speg.
Tephrocactus Lem.

Systematics 

Current research shows conflicting arguments over the phylogenetic accuracy of the tribes and genera listed above.  A major challenge in Opuntioideae classification is that the subfamily is known to hybridize (particularly the Opuntieae tribe), which further complicates how to define at the species level.  In addition, the genera within each tribe exhibits variation in morphology, which makes using genetic analysis more important in determining relationships, since defining physical characteristics may be unseen in some genera.

In 2009, a study by Griffith and Porter, based on ribosomal intergenic spacer analysis defined four tribes of Opuntioideae:

 Core Maihueniopsis - which was shown as monophyletic through genetic analysis
 Pterocactus - defined by a winged seed
 Terete-stemmed - defined by cylinder-shaped stems
 Flat-stemmed - defined by flat stems

However, this classification has been questioned by additional research that did not yield the same systematic results.  Specifically, there was differences in yielded relationships based on what genetic sequences and analysis was being utilized.

In 2010, it was proposed by Nyffeler and Eggli, as part of a larger overhaul of Cactaceae systematics, to only recognize Cylindropuntieae and Opuntieae as true tribes of Opuntioideae, since they are the tribes generally agreed upon to be monophyletic.  It was proposed to include all other genera into one polyphyletic basal group until further research concludes more definitive answers to their phylogeny.

See also
Taxonomy of the Cactaceae

References

 
Caryophyllales subfamilies